Benyon is a surname. Notable people with the surname include:

Edgar Benyon (1901–1978), New Zealand magician, juggler and entertainer
Elliot Benyon, association football player for Torquay United
Henry Benyon JP (1884–1959), the immediate post-War Lord Lieutenant of Berkshire
James Herbert Benyon (1849–1935), early 20th century Lord Lieutenant of Berkshire
Richard Benyon (born 1960), British politician
Richard Benyon De Beauvoir (1796–1854), British landowner, philanthropist, and High Sheriff of Berkshire
Richard Fellowes Benyon (1811–1897), British Conservative politician and civil servant
Thomas Benyon (born 1942), British Conservative Party politician
William Benyon (born 1930), British Conservative Party politician, Berkshire landowner, and former High Sheriff